= Naya Dunia =

Communist publication in India

Naya Dunia was a weekly newspaper published from Sylhet, India. It was an organ of the Communist Party of India. Jyotirmoy Nandy was the editor of the newspaper as of the late 1930s.
